Alexander Hamilton Stephens (February 11, 1812 – March 4, 1883) was an American politician who served as the vice president of the Confederate States from 1861 to 1865, and later as the 50th governor of Georgia from 1882 until his death in 1883. A member of the Democratic Party, he represented the state of Georgia in the United States House of Representatives before and after the Civil War prior to becoming governor.

Stephens attended Franklin College and established a legal practice in his home town of Crawfordville, Georgia. After serving in both houses of the Georgia General Assembly, he won election to Congress, taking his seat in 1843. He became a leading Southern Whig and strongly opposed the Mexican–American War. After the war, Stephens was a prominent supporter of the Compromise of 1850 and helped draft the Georgia Platform, which opposed secession. A proponent of the expansion of slavery into the territories, Stephens also helped pass the Kansas–Nebraska Act. As the Whig Party collapsed in the 1850s, Stephens eventually joined the Democratic Party and worked with President James Buchanan to admit Kansas as a state under the pro-slavery Lecompton Constitution (which was overwhelmingly rejected by voters in a referendum in that state).

Stephens declined to seek re-election in 1858, but continued to publicly advocate against secession. After Georgia and other Southern states seceded and formed the Confederate States of America, Stephens was elected as the Confederate Vice President. Stephens's Cornerstone Speech of March 1861 defended slavery; enumerated contrasts between the American and Confederate foundings, ideologies, and constitutions; and laid out the Confederacy's rationale for seceding. In the course of the war, he became increasingly critical of President Jefferson Davis's policies, especially Confederate conscription and the suspension of habeas corpus. In February 1865, he was one of the commissioners who met with Abraham Lincoln at the abortive Hampton Roads Conference to discuss peace terms.

After the war, Stephens was imprisoned until October 1865. The following year, the Georgia legislature elected Stephens to the United States Senate, but the Senate declined to seat him due to his role in the Civil War. He won election to the House of Representatives in 1873 and held that office until 1882, when he resigned from Congress to become governor of Georgia. Stephens served as governor until his death in March 1883.

Early life

Alexander Stephens was born on February 11, 1812. His parents were Andrew Baskins Stephens and Margaret Grier. The Stephenses lived on a farm in Taliaferro County, Georgia, near Crawfordville. At the time of Alexander Stephens's birth, the farm was part of Wilkes County. Taliaferro County was created in 1825 from land in Greene, Hancock, Oglethorpe, Warren, and Wilkes counties. His father, a native of Pennsylvania, came to Georgia at 12 years of age, in 1795. According to the Biographical Sketch of Linton Stephens (Linton Stephens being Alexander Stephens's half-brother), Andrew B. Stephens was "endowed with uncommon intellectual faculties; he had sound practical judgment; he was a safe counselor, sagacious, self-reliant, candid and courageous."

His mother, a Georgia native and sister of Grier's Almanac founder Robert Grier, died in 1812 at the age of 26; Alexander Stephens was only three months old. In the introduction to Recollections of Alexander H. Stephens, there is this about his mother and her family: "Margaret came of folk who had a liking for books, and a turn for law, war, and meteorology." The introduction continues: "In her son's character was a marked blending of parental traits. He [Alexander Stephens] was thrifty, generous, progressive; one of the best lawyers in the land; a reader and collector of books; a close observer of the weather, and father of the Weather Bureau of the United States." In 1814, Andrew B. Stephens married Matilda Lindsay, daughter of Revolutionary War Colonel John Lindsay.

In May 1826, when Alexander Stephens was 14 years old, his father Andrew and stepmother Matilda died of pneumonia only days apart. Their deaths caused him and several siblings to be scattered among relatives. He grew up poor and in difficult circumstances. Not long after the deaths of his father and his stepmother, Alexander Stephens was sent to live with his mother's other brother, General Aaron W. Grier, near Raytown (Taliaferro County), Georgia. General Grier had inherited his own father's library, said to be "the largest library in all that part of the country." Alexander Stephens, who read voraciously even as a youth, mentions the library in his "Recollections."

Frail but precocious, the young Stephens acquired his continued education through the generosity of several benefactors. One of them was the Presbyterian minister Alexander Hamilton Webster, who presided over a school in Washington, Georgia. Out of respect for his mentor, Stephens adopted Webster's middle name, Hamilton, as his own. Stephens attended the Franklin College (later the University of Georgia) in Athens, Georgia, where he was roommates with Crawford W. Long and a member of the Phi Kappa Literary Society. He raised funds for Phi Kappa Hall, located on the university campus. Stephens graduated at the top of his class in 1832.

Early career
After several unhappy years teaching in school, Stephens began legal studies, was admitted to the Georgia bar in 1834, and began a successful career as a lawyer in Crawfordville. During his 32 years of practice, he gained a reputation as a capable defender of the wrongfully accused. None of his clients charged with capital crimes were executed. As his wealth increased, Stephens began acquiring land and slaves. By the time of the Civil War, Stephens owned 34 slaves and several thousand acres. He entered politics in 1836, and was elected to the Georgia House of Representatives, serving there until 1841. In 1842, he was elected to the Georgia Senate.

Stephens served in the U.S. House from October 2, 1843, to March 3, 1859, from the 28th Congress through the 35th Congress. In 1843, he was elected to the U.S. House of Representatives as a Whig, in a special election to fill the vacancy caused by the resignation of Mark A. Cooper. This seat was at-large, as Georgia did not have House Districts until the next year. Stephens was re-elected from the 7th District as a Whig in 1844, 1846, and 1848, as a Unionist in 1851, and again as a Whig (from the 8th District) in 1853. In 1855 and 1857, his re-elections came as a Democrat. As a national lawmaker during the crucial decades before the Civil War, Stephens was involved in all of the major sectional battles. He began as a moderate defender of slavery but later accepted the prevailing Southern rationale utilized to defend the institution.

Stephens quickly rose to prominence as one of the leading Southern Whigs in the House. He supported the annexation of Texas in 1845. Along with his fellow Whigs, he vehemently opposed the Mexican–American War, and later became an equally vigorous opponent of the Wilmot Proviso, which would have barred the extension of slavery into territories that were acquired after the war. He also controversially tabled the Clayton Compromise, which would have excluded slavery from the Oregon Territory and left the issue of slavery in New Mexico and California to the Supreme Court. This would later nearly kill Stephens when he argued with Georgia Supreme Court Justice Francis H. Cone, who stabbed him repeatedly in a fit of anger. Stephens was physically outmatched by his larger assailant, but he remained defiant during the attack, refusing to recant his positions even at the cost of his life. Only the intervention of others saved him. Stephens's wounds were serious, and he returned home to Crawfordville to recover. He and Cone reconciled before Cone's death in 1859.

Stephens and fellow Georgia Representative Robert Toombs campaigned for the election of Zachary Taylor as president in 1848. Both were chagrined and angered when Taylor proved less than pliable on aspects of the Compromise of 1850. After Taylor supported the ratification of New Mexico’s anti-slavery state constitution and threatened to send troops to defend it against Texas’s territorial claims, Stephens published an open letter in the National Intelligencer calling for Taylor’s impeachment and warned that if the United States were to fire the first shots against Texas it would lead to the Southern states to secede from the Union. Stephens and Toombs both supported said compromise between slave and free states, though they opposed the exclusion of slavery from the territories on the theory that such lands belonged to all of the people. The pair returned from the District of Columbia to Georgia to secure support for the measures at home. Both men were instrumental in the drafting and approval of the Georgia Platform, which rallied Unionists throughout the Deep South.

Stephens and Toombs were not only political allies but also lifelong friends. Stephens was described as "a highly sensitive young man of serious and joyless habits of consuming ambition, of poverty-fed pride, and of morbid preoccupation within self," a contrast to the "robust, wealthy, and convivial Toombs. But this strange camaraderie endured with singular accord throughout their lives."

By this time, Stephens had departed the ranks of the Whig party, its Northern wing generally not amenable to some Southern interests. Back in Georgia, Stephens, Toombs, and Democratic Representative Howell Cobb formed the Constitutional Union Party. The party overwhelmingly carried the state in the ensuing election and, for the first time, Stephens returned to Congress no longer a Whig. Stephens spent the next few years as a Constitutional Unionist, essentially an independent. He vigorously opposed the dismantling of the Constitutional Union Party when it began crumbling in 1851. Political realities soon forced the Union Democrats in the party to affiliate once more with the national party, and by mid-1852, the combination of both Democrats and Whigs, which had formed a "party" behind the Compromise, had ended.

The sectional issue surged to the forefront again in 1854, when Senator Stephen A. Douglas from Illinois moved to organize the Nebraska Territory, all of which lay north of the Missouri Compromise line, in the Kansas–Nebraska Act. This legislation aroused fury in the North because it applied the popular sovereignty principle to the Territory, in violation of the Missouri Compromise. Had it not been for Stephens, the bill probably never would have passed in the House. He employed an obscure House rule to bring the bill to a vote. He later called this "the greatest glory of my life."

From this point on, Stephens voted with the Democrats. Until after 1855, Stephens could not be properly called a Democrat, and even then, he never officially declared it. In this move, Stephens broke irrevocably with many of his former Whig colleagues. When the Whig Party disintegrated after the election of 1852, some Whigs flocked to the short-lived Know-Nothing Party, but Stephens fiercely opposed the Know-Nothings both for their secrecy and their anti-immigrant and anti-Catholic position.

Despite his late arrival in the Democratic Party, Stephens quickly rose through the ranks. He even served as President James Buchanan's floor manager in the House during the fruitless battle for the slave state Lecompton Constitution for Kansas Territory in 1857. He was instrumental in framing the failed English Bill after it became clear that Lecompton would not pass, in order to negotiate the approval.

Stephens did not seek re-election to Congress in 1858. As sectional peace eroded during the next two years, Stephens became increasingly critical of Southern extremists. Although virtually the entire South had spurned Douglas as a traitor to Southern rights because he had opposed the Lecompton Constitution and broken with Buchanan, Stephens remained on good terms with Douglas and even served as one of his presidential electors in the election of 1860.

On November 14, 1860, Stephens delivered a speech entitled "The Assertions of a Secessionist." He said:

On the eve of the outbreak of the American Civil War, Stephens counseled delay in moving militarily against U.S.-held Fort Sumter and Fort Pickens so that the Confederacy could build up its forces and stock resources.

Vice President of the Confederate States

In 1861, Stephens was elected as a delegate to the Georgia Secession Convention to decide Georgia's response to the election of Abraham Lincoln. During the convention, as well as during the 1860 presidential campaign, Stephens, who came to be known as the sage of Liberty Hall, called for the South to remain loyal to the Union, likening it to a leaking but fixable boat. During the convention he reminded his fellow delegates that Republicans were a minority in Congress (especially in the Senate) and, even with a Republican president, they would be forced to compromise just as the two sections had for decades. Because the Supreme Court had voted 7–2 in the Dred Scott case, it would take decades of Senate-approved appointments to reverse it. He voted against secession in the convention but asserted the right to secede if the federal government continued allowing northern states to nullify the Fugitive Slave Law with "personal liberty laws." He was elected to the Confederate Congress and was chosen by the Congress as vice president of the provisional government. He took the provisional oath of office on February 11, 1861, then the 'full term' oath of office on February 22, 1862 (after being elected in November 1861), and served until his arrest on May 11, 1865. Stephens officially served in office eight days longer than President Jefferson Davis; he took his oath seven days before Davis's inauguration and was captured the day after Davis.

In 1862, Stephens first publicly expressed his opposition to the Davis administration. Throughout the war he denounced many of the president's policies, including conscription, suspension of the writ of habeas corpus, impressment, various financial and taxation policies, and Davis's military strategy.

In mid-1863, Davis dispatched Stephens along with Stonewall Jackson and Robert E. Lee on a fruitless mission to Washington, D.C., to discuss prisoner exchanges, but the Union victory of Gettysburg made the Lincoln administration refuse to receive him. As the war continued and the fortunes of the Confederacy sank lower, Stephens became more outspoken in his opposition to the administration. On March 16, 1864, Stephens delivered a speech to the Georgia Legislature that was widely reported in both the North and the South. In it, he excoriated the Davis Administration for its support of conscription and suspension of habeas corpus, and supported a block of resolutions aimed at securing peace. From then until the end of the war, as he continued to press for actions aimed at bringing about peace, his relations with Davis, never warm to begin with, turned completely sour.

On February 3, 1865, Stephens was one of three Confederate commissioners who met with Lincoln on the steamer River Queen at the Hampton Roads Conference, a fruitless effort to discuss measures to bring an end to the fight. Stephens and Lincoln had been close friends and Whig political allies in the 1840s. Although peace terms were not reached, Lincoln did agree to look into the whereabouts of Stephens's nephew, Confederate Lieutenant John A. Stephens. When Lincoln returned to Washington, he ordered the release of Lieutenant Stephens.

Stephens was arrested for treason against the United States at his home in Crawfordville, on May 11, 1865. He was imprisoned in Fort Warren, Boston Harbor, for five months until October 1865.

Cornerstone Speech 
Stephens' Cornerstone Speech on March 21, 1861 to the The Savannah Theatre is frequently cited in historical analysis of Confederate ideology. The speech defended slavery; enumerated contrasts between the American and Confederate foundings, ideologies, and constitutions; and laid out the Confederacy's rationale for seceding. Historian Keith S. Hébert describes it as "the most significant speech" ever delivered by Stephens. It declared that disagreements over the enslavement of Africans were the "immediate cause" of secession and that the Confederate constitution had resolved such issues.  The new [Confederate] Constitution has put at rest forever all the agitating questions relating to our peculiar institutions—African slavery as it exists among us—the proper status of the negro in our form of civilization. This was the immediate cause of the late rupture and present revolution. Jefferson, in his forecast, had anticipated this, as the "rock upon which the old Union would split." He was right. What was conjecture with him, is now a realized fact. But whether he fully comprehended the great truth upon which that rock stood and stands, may be doubted. 
Stephens contended that advances and progress in the sciences proved that the United States Declaration of Independence's view that "all men are created equal" was erroneous. His speech criticized "most of the leading statesmen at the time of the formation of the old Constitution" for their views on slavery, stating that: The prevailing ideas entertained by him and most of the leading statesmen at the time of the formation of the old Constitution [Founding Fathers] were, that the enslavement of the African was in violation of the laws of nature; that it was wrong in principle, socially, morally, and politically. It was an evil they knew not well how to deal with; but the general opinion of the men of that day was, that, somehow or other, in the order of Providence, the institution would be evanescent and pass away. Those ideas, however, were fundamentally wrong. They rested upon the assumption of the equality of races. 

This was an error. It was a sandy foundation, and the idea of a Government built upon it - "when the storm came and the wind blew, it fell."Stephens proceeded to state that in contrast to the United States:Our new Government is founded upon exactly the opposite ideas; its foundations are laid, its cornerstone rests, upon the great truth that the negro is not equal to the white man; that slavery, subordination to the superior race, is his natural and normal condition. 

This, our new Government, is the first, in the history of the world, based on this great physical, philosophical, and moral truth.Criticizing the position of Northern evangelicals who were opposed to slavery, Stephens quoted the Psalm 118:22 and Curse of Ham to biblically justify the institution, and stated that:With us, all of the white race, however high or low, rich or poor, are equal in the eye of the law. Not so with the negro. Subordination is his place. He, by nature, or by the curse against Canaan, is fitted for that condition which he occupies in our system. The architect, in the construction of buildings, lays the foundation with the proper material-the granite; then comes the brick or the marble. The substratum of our society is made of the material fitted by nature for it, and by experience we know that it is best, not only for the superior, but for the inferior race, that it should be so...

Concluding:

This stone which was "rejected by the first builders" [Founding Fathers] " — is become the chief of the corner" — the real "corner-stone" in our new edifice.After the Confederacy's defeat, Stephens attempted to retroactively deny and retract the opinions he had stated in the speech. Denying his earlier statements that slavery was the Confederacy's cause for leaving the Union, he contended to the contrary that he thought that the war was rooted in constitutional differences; this explanation by Stephens is widely rejected by historians. Hébert states that "the speech haunted Stephens to the grave and beyond as he and other postbellum southern Democrats struggled to conceal the clear meaning of his words under the camouflage of a Lost Cause mythology."

Later life

In 1866, Stephens was elected to the United States Senate by the first legislature convened under the new Georgia State Constitution, but was not allowed to take his seat because of restrictions on former Confederates. He published a U.S. history in 1868–1870, laying out the Lost Cause of the Confederacy in his view: that secession was legal, and the attacks from the North aggression. The thrust of his legal argument was rejected by the Supreme Court in the 1869 case Texas v. White, ruling secession to be unconstitutional.

In 1873, Stephens was elected to the United States House of Representatives as a Democrat from the 8th District to fill the vacancy caused by the death of Ambrose R. Wright. He was re-elected to the 8th District as an Independent Democrat in 1874, 1876, and 1878, and as a Democrat again in 1880. He described himself, on the title page of the 1876 edition of his Compendium, as "Professor Elect of History and Political Science at the University of Georgia." He served in the 43rd through 47th Congresses, from December 1, 1873, until his resignation on November 4, 1882. On that date, he was elected and took office as governor of Georgia. His tenure as governor proved brief; Stephens died on March 4, 1883, four months after taking office.

Stephens was sickly throughout his life, most painfully from "crippling rheumatoid arthritis and a pinched nerve in his back." Almost all of his former slaves continued to work for him, often for little or no money; whether this decision was voluntary or the result of few other options existing for former slaves in the Deep South is difficult to determine. These servants were with him upon his death. Although old and infirm, Stephens continued to work on his house and plantation. According to a former slave, a gate fell on Stephens while he and another black servant were repairing it, "and he was crippled and lamed up from that time on till he died." The veracity of this rumor is difficult to determine as the cited ex-slave was not present when this happened.

Personal life
A lifelong bachelor, Stephens never married and has no known direct descendants.

Works

Speeches
 
 
 
 
 
 Cornerstone Speech, March 21, 1861.

Books

Legacy

 Stephens is pictured on the Confederate States $20.00 banknote (3rd, 5th, 6th, and 7th issues).
 Stephens County, Georgia, and Stephens County, Texas, bear his name, as does A. H. Stephens State Park, near Crawfordville, containing his home, Liberty Hall.
 A collection of Stephens's personal papers has been digitized and is available at the Rubenstein Library, Duke University.
 A sculpture of Stephens appears in the National Statuary Hall Collection, representing one of two figures from Georgia history, the other being Crawford W. Long. There have been calls to replace Stephens's sculpture in the collection with that of some other Georgian, such as Martin Luther King Jr.
 According to Bruce Catton, Stephens was "given one of the most haunting nicknames ever worn by an American politician: 'The Little Pale Star from Georgia.'"

See also
 Cornerstone Speech
 List of signers of the Georgia Ordinance of Secession

References

Notes

Citations

Further reading

 
 Brumgardt, John R. "The Confederate Career of Alexander H. Stephens: The Case Reopened." Civil War History 27.1 (1981): 64-81. excerpt
 Brumgardt, John R. "Alexander H. Stephens and the State Convention Movement in Georgia: A Reappraisal." Georgia Historical Quarterly 59.1 (1975): 38-49. online

 
 Coulter, E. Merton. "Alexander H. Stephens Challenges Benjamin H. Hill to a Duel." Georgia Historical Quarterly 56.2 (1972): 175-192. online

 

 Golden, James L. "Alexander H. Stephens speaks for the union." Quarterly Journal of Speech 47.4 (1961): 355-362. https://doi.org/10.1080/00335636109382498
 Hall, Mark. "Alexander H. Stephens and Joseph E. Brown and the Georgia Resolutions for Peace." Georgia Historical Quarterly 64.1 (1980): 50-63. online

 Rabun, James Z. "Alexander H. Stephens and Jefferson Davis." American Historical Review 58.2 (1953): 290-321. online

 
 Stephens, Robert Grier. "The Background and Boyhood of Alexander H. Stephens." Georgia Review 9.4 (1955): 386-397. online

 Wakelyn, Jon L. Biographical Dictionary of the Confederacy (1977). online
 Wilson, Edmund.   Patriotic Gore: Studies in the Literature of the American Civil War (1962) ch 11, on his book. online

Primary sources
  Phillips, Ulrich Bonnell, ed. The correspondence of Robert Toombs, Alexander H. Stephens, and Howell Cobb (1970 reprint of 1913 original) online

External links

 
 
 
 

 The Papers of Alexander H. Stephens at Duke University
 The Papers of Alexander H. Stephens at the Historical Society of Pennsylvania
 The Papers of Alexander H. Stephens at the University of Georgia
 The Library of Alexander H. Stevens at the A. H. Stephens Historic Park
 
 
 
 Stuart A. Rose Manuscript, Archives, and Rare Book Library, Emory University: Alexander Hamilton Stephens collection, 1821–1935
 Guide to the Alexander H. Stephens Collection 1870–1876 at the University of Chicago Special Collections Research Center

1812 births
1883 deaths
19th-century American politicians
Activists from Georgia (U.S. state)
American planters
American proslavery activists
American slave owners
Authors' libraries in the United States
Burials at Oakland Cemetery (Atlanta)
Executive members of the Cabinet of the Confederate States of America
Constitutional Union Party members of the United States House of Representatives
Democratic Party members of the United States House of Representatives from Georgia (U.S. state)
Democratic Party governors of Georgia (U.S. state)
Deputies and delegates to the Provisional Congress of the Confederate States
Georgia (U.S. state) Constitutional Unionists
Georgia (U.S. state) state senators
Georgia (U.S. state) Whigs
Governors of Georgia (U.S. state)
Heads of state of states with limited recognition
Members of the Georgia House of Representatives
People from Crawfordville, Georgia
People from Taliaferro County, Georgia
People of Georgia (U.S. state) in the American Civil War
Signers of the Confederate States Constitution
Signers of the Georgia Ordinance of Secession
Signers of the Provisional Constitution of the Confederate States
University of Georgia alumni
University of Georgia faculty
Whig Party members of the United States House of Representatives
Southern Historical Society